Alfred Dick may refer to:

 Alfred Dick (politician) (1927–2005), German politician and school teacher
 Alfred Dick (entrepreneur) (1865–1909), Swiss sports executive and entrepreneur